Margaret Bushby Lascelles Cockburn (2 July 1829 – 26 March 1928) was an artist and amateur ornithologist who lived in the Nilgiris in India. She was born in Salem, India, and her father was the Collector of the District, M. D. Cockburn. The family initially visited Kotagiri in summer but settled permanently around 1855 at "Hope Park". Cockburn experimented on tea planting at Alports Estate and made numerous observations on local natural history and many of these were reported in the works of Allan Octavian Hume. She also made paintings of local birds and flora. The Natural History Museum, London, produced a diary in 2002 with illustrations made by her of the fauna and flora of the Kotagiri region. A collection of butterflies was also bequeathed to the Natural History Museum.

She set up the first school for Badagas and contributed towards the construction of a church at Kotagiri in 1867 which was later taken over by the Basel Mission. A subspecies of Anthus similis from the Nilgiri region was named after her, but this is no longer considered valid.

References

External links 
 Pictures from the Natural History Museum
 Gravestone from the Kotagiri cemetery

Indian women painters
1928 deaths
1829 births
Indian ornithologists
20th-century Indian painters
Women ornithologists
People from Salem, Tamil Nadu
20th-century Indian women artists
19th-century Indian painters
19th-century Indian women artists
19th-century Indian zoologists
20th-century Indian zoologists
Painters from Tamil Nadu
Women artists from Tamil Nadu